Francis Joseph Xavier Scully; (April 28 1892 – June 23 1964) was an American journalist, author, humorist, and a regular columnist for the entertainment trade magazine Variety.

Career 
Scully studied journalism at Columbia University, was on the reporting staff at The New York Sun, and was a contributor to Variety. His authored books include Rogue's Gallery and Fun In Bed: The Convalescent's Handbook. Scully received a screenwriting credit for the American version of the film Une fée... pas comme les autres (The Secret of Magic Island).

Scully publicized the Aztec, New Mexico UFO hoax when, in 1949, he authored two columns in Variety claiming that dead extraterrestrial beings were recovered from a flying saucer crash. 
Scully's 1950 book Behind the Flying Saucers expanded on the themes of flying saucer crashes and dead extraterrestrials, with Scully describing one of his sources as having "more degrees than a thermometer." In 1952 and 1956, True magazine published articles by San Francisco Chronicle reporter John Philip Cahn 
that purported to expose Scully's sources as con artists who had hoaxed Scully. Scully's 1963 book In Armour Bright also included material about alleged flying saucer crashes and dead extraterrestrials.

Publications

Books

Contributions, introductions, forewords

Feature films

Archives
  Collection Number 09554 processed in 1995.

See also
 Aztec, New Mexico UFO hoax
 Donald Keyhoe
 Frank Edwards

Notes

References

External links
 
 "Flying Saucers and Frank Scully", a detailed account of Behind the Flying Saucers and subsequent exposé

American male journalists
Journalists from California
1892 births
1964 deaths
Burials at Desert Memorial Park
20th-century American journalists